Tascina metallica is a moth in the Castniidae family. It is found on Borneo and Palawan.

Adults have robust, clubbed antennae. The ground colour of the forewings is black, with an oblique white bar and a broad blue dorsum in males and a black hindwing in females. The hindwing underside is rufous brown, although duller in females with a hint of blue along the dorsum.

References

External links

Moths described in 1890
Castniidae